Patricia Spohn (born 18 March 1961) is an Argentine former swimmer. She competed in three events at the 1976 Summer Olympics.

References

External links
 

1961 births
Living people
Argentine female swimmers
Olympic swimmers of Argentina
Swimmers at the 1976 Summer Olympics
Place of birth missing (living people)